DIRECTV, Inc. v. Imburgia, 577 U.S. ___ (2015), was a case in which the Supreme Court of the United States clarified when arbitration provisions in contracts are governed by the Federal Arbitration Act. In a 6–3 opinion written by Justice Stephen Breyer, the Court reversed a decision by the California Court of Appeal that refused to enforce an arbitration agreement between DIRECTV and its customers. The California Court had ruled that the arbitration agreement was unenforceable because, under applicable California law, a class action arbitration waiver between DIRECTV and its customers was unenforceable. However, the Supreme Court of the United States held that the California Court of Appeal's interpretation was preempted by the Federal Arbitration Act, and the California Court of Appeal was therefore required to enforce the arbitration agreement.

Justice Clarence Thomas filed a dissent, restating his view that the Federal Arbitration Act does not apply to proceedings in state courts. Justice Ruth Bader Ginsburg, joined by Justice Sonia Sotomayor, also filed a dissent, writing that the majority's decision "again expanded the scope of the FAA, further degrading the rights of consumers and further insulating already powerful economic entities from liability for unlawful acts".

See also
 List of United States Supreme Court cases
 Lists of United States Supreme Court cases by volume
 List of United States Supreme Court cases by the Roberts Court

References

External links
 

United States Supreme Court cases
United States Supreme Court cases of the Roberts Court
2015 in United States case law
DirecTV
AT&T litigation
United States arbitration case law